Kento (written: , , , , , , ,  or ) is a masculine Japanese given name. Notable people with the name include:

, Japanese footballer
, Japanese actor
, Japanese actor
, Japanese footballer
, Japanese footballer
, Japanese actor
, Japanese footballer
, Japanese Paralympic judoka
, Japanese composer and recording artist
, Japanese professional wrestler
, Japanese volleyball player
, Japanese badminton player
, Japanese actor
, Japanese idol
, Japanese figure skater
, Japanese actor
, Japanese ski jumper
, Japanese footballer
, Japanese baseball player
, Japanese footballer
, Japanese baseball player
, Japanese actor
Kento Muceleb (born 1999), Zimbabwean actor

Japanese masculine given names